Earl Davis Cook (December 10, 1908 – November 21, 1996) was a relief pitcher in Major League Baseball who played briefly for the Detroit Tigers during the 1941 season. Listed at 6' 0", 195 lb., Cook batted and threw right-handed In one game appearance, Cook posted a 4.50 ERA with one strikeout in 2.0 innings of work.

Born in Stouffville, Ontario, Cook died in Markham, Ontario in 1996.

Sources

1908 births
1996 deaths
Baseball pitchers
Baseball people from Ontario
Canadian expatriate baseball players in the United States
Detroit Tigers players
Major League Baseball pitchers
Major League Baseball players from Canada
People from Whitchurch-Stouffville
People from Markham, Ontario